Trithemis aequalis is a species of dragonfly in the family Libellulidae. It is found in Botswana, Namibia, and Zambia.

References

aequalis
Taxonomy articles created by Polbot
Insects described in 1969